Muhammed Ildiz (born 14 May 1991) is an Austrian professional footballer who plays as a midfielder for SC Wiener Viktoria.

Club career
On the last day of the 2019 winter transfer window, Ildiz was one of 22 players on two hours, that signed for Turkish club Elazığspor. had been placed under a transfer embargo but managed to negotiate it with the Turkish FA, leading to them going on a mad spree of signing and registering a load of players despite not even having a permanent manager in place. In just two hours, they managed to snap up a record 22 players - 12 coming in on permanent contracts and a further 10 joining on loan deals until the end of the season. His contract was terminated on 30 May 2019.

International career
Ildiz was born in Austria and is of Turkish descent. He is a youth international for Austria.

Personal life
Muhammed is the older brother of footballer Ahmed Ildiz.

References

External links
 
 
 

Living people
1991 births
Austrian people of Turkish descent
Austrian footballers
Footballers from Vienna
Association football midfielders
Austria youth international footballers
Austrian Football Bundesliga players
Bundesliga players
Süper Lig players
TFF First League players
TFF Second League players
FC Wacker Innsbruck (2002) players
SK Rapid Wien players
1. FC Nürnberg players
Elazığspor footballers
Gaziantepspor footballers
Giresunspor footballers
FC Mauerwerk players
Austrian expatriate footballers
Austrian expatriate sportspeople in Germany
Expatriate footballers in Germany
Austrian expatriate sportspeople in Turkey
Expatriate footballers in Turkey